Patu! is a 1983 New Zealand documentary film directed by Merata Mita about the controversial 1981 Springbok tour. It follows the inner workings of the campaign against the tour, and captures scenes of violent conflict between police and protesters. It is a significant work of activist and indigenous filmmaking, and of New Zealand filmmaking in general.

Background

New Zealand’s All-Blacks and South Africa’s Springboks have been frequent rugby rivals since 1921. The Springbok team had been the targets of protests over the last couple decades as a response to South African apartheid. The protests that met the 1981 tour were some of the most volatile in New Zealand history. It is said the campaign split the country between pro-tour and anti-tour, not least because of rugby's place in the country's national identity. The documentary takes a decisively anti-tour perspective, pointing the conversation about South African apartheid towards racial discrimination practiced in New Zealand.

Production history

Mita began producing the film as a 25-minute documentary for TVNZ, although its sensitive politics would necessitate the completion of the film independently. The film was created on a $41,000 budget contributed to by the New Zealand Film Commission, the Arts Council of New Zealand, and the National Catholic Commission. Fifteen camera operators and thirteen sound recordists are credited for the finished film, though Mita also used family members in the crew. They worked without pay, and often in dangerous circumstances.

The editing process lasted two years, complicated by the various types of film stock used, the refusal of television networks to lend footage, and the need to protect the negatives from being seized by police as evidence. Mita complained of police harassment as they regularly visited her house on this pretence.

Release history

Patu! premiered at the 1983 Wellington Film Festival to a standing ovation. A shorter 83-minute version had further screenings at international film festivals. It was not shown on New Zealand television until the 10th anniversary of the tour in 1991.

Credits

Reception and legacy

Patu! has been acclaimed as a historical document and as a cinematic polemic. It has been called one of New Zealand's most important documentaries. Along with Canadian Abenaki Alanis Obomsawin’s films like 1984’s Incident at Restigouche and Mita’s earlier 1980 film Bastion Point: Day 507, Patu! is an early example of indigenous female filmmaking.
The film has met with criticism for depicting the events solely from the perspective of the protesters, and accusations of bias and partisanship. Mita has responded “The Pakeha bias in all things recorded in Aotearoa was never questioned... Yes, Patu! has a Māori perspective, but it does not override the mass mobilisation of New Zealand's white middle class, neither does it take credit from those who rightly deserve it”.

In 2012, the 1983 theatrical cut of Patu! and supporting materials were added to New Zealand’s national UNESCO Memory of the World register.

References

External links

Full film at NZonScreen

1980s New Zealand films
1983 documentary films
1983 films
New Zealand documentary films